Brian Rosso (born August 16, 1987) is an Argentine rower. He placed 15th in the men's single sculls event at the 2016 Summer Olympics.

References

1987 births
Living people
Argentine male rowers
Olympic rowers of Argentina
Rowers at the 2016 Summer Olympics
Pan American Games medalists in rowing
Pan American Games bronze medalists for Argentina
Rowers at the 2015 Pan American Games
South American Games gold medalists for Argentina
South American Games medalists in rowing
Competitors at the 2014 South American Games
Medalists at the 2015 Pan American Games